East Alaska Lake is a lake in central Kewaunee County, Wisconsin, it is the biggest inland lake in the county. The lake is located on a golf course. Fish in the lake include Bluegill, Largemouth Bass, Northern Pike, and Muskellunge.

References
 University Of Wisconsin Lake page
 Full lake Details

Lakes of Kewaunee County, Wisconsin